Şenol Birol (1936 – 3 March 2022) was a Turkish footballer who played as a forward, notably for Beşiktaş and Fenerbahçe.

Career
Born in Rize, Birol started his professional career with Sarıyer S.K. and then transferred to Beşiktaş where he played four years between 1959 and 1963. Then he transferred to Fenerbahçe with his team mate Birol Pekel. He played with Fenerbahçe between 1963 and 1966. He also played with Karşıyaka S.K. (1966–67) and last he played with Beşiktaş in the 1967–68 season.

Beşiktaş fans chanted Şenol-Birol Goal in his and Pekel's honour.

Personal life
Birol died on 3 March 2022, at the age of 86.

Career statistics
Scores and results list Turkey's goal tally first, score column indicates score after each Birol goal.

Honours
Beşiktaş
Süper Lig: 1959-60

Fenerbahçe
Süper Lig: 1963-64, 1964-65

References

External links
 

1936 births
2022 deaths
Sportspeople from Rize
Turkish footballers
Association football forwards
Turkey international footballers
Beşiktaş J.K. footballers
Fenerbahçe S.K. footballers
Karşıyaka S.K. footballers
Çaykur Rizespor footballers
Turkish football managers